Mudhol State was a princely state during the British Raj. The rulers were from the Ghorpade clan of the Marathas. It was one of the former states of the Southern Maratha Country and its capital was the city of Mudhol in present-day Bagalkote District of Karnataka State in India. The last ruler was HH Shrimant Raja Bhairavsinhrao Malojirao Ghorpade II.  Mudhol acceded to the Dominion of India on 8 March 1948, and is currently a part of Karnataka state.

According to the 1901 census, the population was 63,001, with the population of the town itself at 8,359 in that year.

History
The Mudhol jagir (estate) was founded ca 1400. Ruled by the Maratha Ghorpade dynasty. In 1670, Mudhol estate became a state. It became a British protectorate in 1819. The state flag, called 'Bavuta', was a triangular tricolour of horizontal bands, in order from the top: white, black and green. All colour bands came to the point in the fly. Mudhol State was one of the 9-gun salute states of British India, under the summit of Niranjan.

Mudhol State's last king, HH Shrimant Raja Bhairavsinhrao Malojirao Ghorpade II, born 15 October 1929 and succeeded to the throne on 9 November 1937, was the 23rd Raja of Mudhol. He signed the accession to join the Indian Union on  8 March 1948. He died in 1984 in a car accident.

Royal Titles

Rajas

1662 – 1700                Maloji Raje Ghorpade               (d. 1700) 
1700 – 1734                Sardar Akhayaji Raje Ghorpade      (d. 1734) 
1734 – 1737                Pirajirao Raje Ghorpade            (d. 1737)
1737 – 1805                Malojirao III Raje Ghorpade        (b. 1710 – d. 1805) 
1805 – 1816                Narayanrao Raje Ghorpade           (d. 1816) 
1816 – 20 February 1818         Govindrao Raje Ghorpade            (d. 1818) 
20 Feb 1818 – Dec 1854     Vyankatrao I Raje Ghorpade         (d. 1854) 
Dec 1854 – 27 March 1862     Balwantrao Raje Ghorpade           (b. 1841 – d. 1862) 
27 Mar 1862 – 19 June 1900  Vyankatrao II Raje Ghorpade        (b. 1861 – d. 1900) "Bala Sahib" 
27 Mar 1862 – 1882         .... -Regent
19 Jun 1900 – 14 November 1939  Malojirao IV Raje Ghorpade         (b. 1884 – d. 1937) "Nana Sahib" (from 1 Jan *1920, Sir Malojirao IV Raje Ghorpade)
19 Jun 1900 – 1904         Council of Regency
14 Nov 1937 – 15 August 1947  Bhairavsinhrao Raje Ghorpade       (b. 1929 – d. 1984)
14 Nov 1937 – 10 July 1947  Parvatidevi Raje Sahib – Ghorpade (f) -Regent
20 Oct 2006–present      Raje Vikramsinha Gourishankar Ghorpade (b. 1986 – d. 1 May 2018 by Evo12) "Bala Sahib" (Sweet Prince)

Mudhol Hound
Shrimant Rajesaheb Malojirao Ghorpade of Mudhol (1884–1937) of the Mudhol State is credited with reviving the Mudhol hound. He noticed local tribal people using these hounds for hunting. Using selective breeding, he was able to restore the royal Mudhol hound. On a visit to England in the early 1900s, the Maharaja of Mudhol State presented King George V a pair of hounds, which popularized the Mudhol hound breed.

See also
 Maratha
 Maratha Empire
 List of Maratha dynasties and states
 List of Indian princely states

References

Princely states of India
History of Karnataka
15th-century establishments in India
1465 establishments in Asia
1948 disestablishments in India
Bagalkot district
Rajputs